The triathlon competitions at the 2020 Summer Olympics in Tokyo featured fifty-five athletes competing in each of the men's and women's events.  It also added the new mixed team relay event.

Format
The Olympic triathlon contains three components; a  swim,  cycle, and a  run. The competitions take the form of a single event between all competitors with no heats.

The new mixed team event features teams of four (two men and two women). Each athlete performs a triathlon of  swim,  cycle, and a  run in a relay format.

Qualification

The qualification period spanned from 11 May 2018 to 11 May 2020. A total of 110 athletes (55 for each gender) vied for the coveted spots with a maximum of three per gender for each NOC. Qualification places are awarded first through the ITU mixed relay rankings of 31 March 2020, with seven NOCs each earning four quota spots (two per gender). Three more NOCs can earn four quota spots apiece at the 2020 ITU Mixed Relay Olympic Qualification Event. Individual rankings of 11 May 2020 are considered next, with the top 26 individuals per gender qualifying, subject to the limit of three per NOC and ignoring the first two from each NOC that qualified via mixed teams. One additional spot for each continent will go to the highest-ranked competitor from an NOC that has not yet earned a qualifying spot. The host, Japan, is guaranteed two spots per gender. The final two spots per gender are awarded through Tripartite Commission invitations.

Schedule
 All times and dates use Japan Standard Time (UTC+9). All event times are subject to change.

Participating nations
The list shows the number of participating athletes from each nation.

*

*Host nation indicated in bold.

Medal summary

Medal table

Events

See also
Triathlon at the Summer Olympics
Triathlon at the 2018 Asian Games
Triathlon at the 2019 Pan American Games
Paratriathlon at the 2020 Summer Paralympics

References

External links
 Results book 

 
Triathlon competitions in Japan
2020
2020 Summer Olympics events
2021 in triathlon